Ian Crawford is professor of economics at the University of Oxford and a fellow of Nuffield College. Crawford is a research fellow at the Institute of Fiscal Studies. Crawford's research relates to the analysis of individual behaviour, with reference to nonparametric economic theory and statistical methods.

Education
Ph.D. Economics, University College London, University of London, 1997
M.Sc. Economics, University of Bristol, 1991
B.A. Economics (1), Birmingham Polytechnic, 1990

References 

Fellows of Nuffield College, Oxford
Living people
Year of birth missing (living people)
British economists
Alumni of University College London
Alumni of the University of Bristol
Alumni of Birmingham City University